Particulate filter may refer to:

 HEPA filter, for filtering particulates out of indoor air
 Mechanical filter (respirator), a wearable filter
 Diesel particulate filter, used in diesel engines
 Gasoline particulate filter, used in gasoline engines